Johana Gómez can refer to:

Johana Gómez (softball), Venezuelan softball player
Johana Gómez (boxer), Venezuelan boxer